José Pedro Kumamoto Aguilar is a Mexican political activist who in 2015 became the first independent candidate to win a seat in the Congress of Jalisco. In 2017, he ran as an independent candidate for Senate of the Republic representing Jalisco, but he was not elected.

Early life and education
Kumamoto's paternal great-grandfather was a Japanese immigrant who settled in Chiapas and married an indigenous Tzotzil woman.

Kumamoto holds a bachelor's degree in Cultural administration from the ITESO.

References

Living people
Members of the Congress of Jalisco
Western Institute of Technology and Higher Education alumni
Politicians from Jalisco
Mexican politicians of Japanese descent
Mexican people of Japanese descent
1990 births
Independent politicians in Mexico
21st-century Mexican politicians